Frances Ademola is a Ghanaian artist, gallerist and former broadcaster. She is the owner of The Loom, the first private owned gallery in Ghana.

Early life and education 
Ademola was born on July17, 1928 in Accra. She had her early education at Government Girls' School from 1932 to1939, then proceeded to Achimota School from 1939 to 1944. She then had her tertiary education at Westonbirt School, Tetbury, Gloucestershire, England from 1946 to 1948 and the University of Exeter, England from the year1949 to 1953. She moved to Nigeria where she stayed for 12 years before moving back to Ghana in 1969.

Career 
Ademola worked at the Gold Coast Broadcasting System, now known as Ghana Broadcasting Corporation from 1954 to 1956 as a senior producer. She then moved to the Nigeria Broadcasting Corporation(NBC) from 1958 to 1960. She then headed the Western Regional Programs of Nigeria Broadcasting Corporation(NBC) from 1960 to 1963 and later became proprietor.

Personal life 
She was married to Adenekan, son of Adetokunbo Ademola.

References 

Living people
1928 births
Ghanaian artists